Los Brasiles Airport (Spanish: Pista Aérea Carlos Ulloa)  is an airport serving Mateare, a municipality of the Managua Department of Nicaragua.

History
In the early 1980s, the airstrip was used primarily by light aircraft for aerial fumigation. The Los Brasiles Airport was renovated in 2010 by the Nicaraguan Civil Aeronautics Authority (INAC).

The Aviation Technical Training Institute (INTECA) was located for several years at Los Brasiles Airport.

See also

 List of airports in Nicaragua
 Transport in Nicaragua

References

External links
OpenStreetMap - Los Brasiles Airport
OurAirports - Los Brasiles Airport

Airports in Nicaragua
Managua Department